The Yellow Line is a Bay Area Rapid Transit (BART) line in the San Francisco Bay Area that runs from Antioch station to San Francisco International Airport station (SFO). After 9 pm, all trains are extended from SFO to Millbrae station to replace the Red Line. It serves 28 stations in Antioch, Pittsburg, Bay Point, Concord, Pleasant Hill, Walnut Creek, Lafayette, Orinda, Oakland, San Francisco, Daly City, Colma, South San Francisco, San Bruno, and Millbrae. It is the most-used BART line, and the only line with short turn trains to provide additional service.

The line is split into two segments. The majority of the line uses the same electric multiple unit trains as the rest of BART, and shares tracks with the four other mainline services. The  section from Antioch to near Pittsburg/Bay Point station, known as eBART, uses diesel multiple units. A cross-platform transfer between the two modes is made at a dedicated transfer platform east of Pittsburg/Bay Point station. However, the line is shown on maps as one route, and headsigns and station information display the ultimate terminus of the line.

History 

The Yellow Line was the second of BART's five rapid transit lines to open. The line was extended to  when the Transbay Tube opened on September 16, 1974.

Until 2015, rush hour service included trains that short turned at Concord; these trains originated at  during the morning peak and returned to 24th Street Mission during the evening peak. On April 1, 2015, BART fully opened the Central Contra Costa Crossover, a pair of crossover tracks south of Pleasant Hill/Contra Costa Centre station that allow trains to terminate there. On September 14, 2015, the Concord short turns were cut to Pleasant Hill to allow for increased frequency. Reverse peak "Pleasant Hill Limited" trains bypassed Rockridge, Orinda, Lafayette, and Walnut Creek stations eastbound in the morning peak, and Lafayette and Orinda westbound in the evening. The short turn trains were re-extended to Concord on February 10, 2020. The extra commute trains were eliminated effective March 19, 2020, due to ridership decreases caused by the COVID-19 pandemic.

In March 2016, mysterious electrical surges caused several cars to be taken out of service on the tracks north of North Concord/Martinez station. On March 16, 2016, BART halted service to Pittsburg/Bay Point station and established a bus bridge between North Concord and Pittsburg/Bay Point. Limited service to Pittsburg/Bay Point resumed on March 21 and full service resumed on April 2.

SFO/Millbrae extension service 
When the SFO/Millbrae extension opened on June 22, 2003, BART extended the Yellow Line to Millbrae but bypassed San Francisco International Airport station (SFO). BART rerouted this line to SFO in place of the Blue Line on February 9, 2004, with service extended to Millbrae outside of weekday peak hours.

San Mateo County is not a member of the San Francisco Bay Area Rapid Transit District, so SamTrans funded the county's BART service. When the extension's lower-than-expected ridership caused SamTrans to accrue deficits, BART agreed to SamTrans' request to operate only the Blue Line south of Daly City effective September 12, 2005.

SamTrans and BART reached an agreement in February 2007 in which SamTrans would transfer control and financial responsibility of the SFO/Millbrae extension to BART, in return for BART receiving additional fixed funding from SamTrans and other sources. In January 2008, BART re-extended the line to SFO at all times, and in September 2009, trains were further extended to Millbrae on evenings and weekends.

Beginning on February 10, 2020, the Yellow Line again terminated at SFO at all times, and service from SFO to Millbrae was once again provided by the Purple Line. Yellow and Purple line trains were interlined on Sundays, with no transfer required at SFO. Beginning on March 22, 2021, the Yellow and Purple lines were interlined on both Saturdays and Sundays. On August 2, 2021, the Purple Line was eliminated as a separate service, with the Yellow Line extended to Millbrae on evenings and Sundays when the Red Line is not operating.

Effective February 14, 2022, all Yellow Line trains terminate at SFO before 9 pm; trains are extended to Millbrae after 9 pm.

Antioch extension service 
BART to Antioch, named during construction and commonly known as eBART (East Contra Costa BART Extension), is a diesel multiple unit (DMU) light rail branch line of the Bay Area Rapid Transit (BART) system in eastern Contra Costa County, California, United States.

Trains and tracks for the portion of the Yellow Line between Antioch and Pittsburg/Bay Point are incompatible with those of the main BART rapid transit system, making it impossible for trains to move between the two systems; instead, passengers transfer via a cross platform interchange at an auxiliary BART stop at Pittsburg/Bay Pointthe BART to Antioch platform is accessible only via an intra-station ride from the main station to this auxiliary stop. Revenue service began on May 26, 2018.

The BART map does not differentiate between this service and the remainder of the Yellow Line. There is a notation on the map published in stations showing a transfer is required, but not on the schedule or map brochures distributed to the public.

Stations

References 

Yellow Line (BART)
Airport rail links in the United States
Railway lines in highway medians
Railway lines opened in 1973
1973 establishments in California